Nikolay Aleksandrovich Lunin (20 August 1907 – 17 November 1970) was an admiral in the Soviet Navy and a Hero of the Soviet Union.

Early life and career
Lunin was born in Odessa, the son of a soldier. He studied at the Rostov-on-Don maritime college and joined the merchant marine serving aboard the tanker Azneft. He joined the Soviet Navy in 1935. He was arrested in the 1938 purge but released after 13 months. He was transferred to the submarine arm.

World War II
He carried out several successful patrols in this boat, sinking a German transport. In February 1942 he was given command of the new K-class submarine, K-21. He subsequently carried out further patrols in Arctic waters and claimed 17 German transports. Confirmed are two ships 2975 BRT in total. In November 1943, he became commander of the Northern Fleet's submarine division. He was promoted to rear admiral in 1958.

After the war Lunin was involved in the Soviet exploration of the Arctic and Antarctic. Lunin retired in 1962 and died in 1970. He is buried in the Bogoslovskoe Cemetery in Saint Petersburg.

Awards and honours 
 Hero of the Soviet Union
 Order of Lenin – twice
 Order of Ushakov 2nd class
 Order of the Red Banner – triple
 Order of the Patriotic War 1st class
 Order of the Red Star
 Order of the British Empire

Streets have been named after him in Mariupol, Polyarny, Sevastopol and Odessa, and also schools in Murmansk and Rostov-on-Don.

References

External links 
 warheroes.ru

Heroes of the Soviet Union
Soviet submarine commanders
Soviet military personnel of World War II
1907 births
1970 deaths
Soviet admirals
People from Mariupol
Recipients of the Order of Lenin
Recipients of the Order of the Red Banner
Recipients of the Order of Ushakov, 2nd class
Burials at Bogoslovskoe Cemetery
N. G. Kuznetsov Naval Academy alumni